Dada Mahalleh (also Romanized as Dādā Maḩalleh; also known as Dādād Maḩalleh) is a village in Machian Rural District, Kelachay District, Rudsar County, Gilan Province, Iran. At the 2006 census, its population was 124, in 36 families.

References 

Populated places in Rudsar County